Group C of the 2019 Copa América took place from 16 to 24 June 2019. The group consisted of title holders Chile, Ecuador, guests Japan of the AFC, and Uruguay.

Uruguay and Chile advanced to the quarter-finals.

Teams

Notes

Standings

In the quarter-finals:
The winners of Group C, Uruguay, advanced to play the third-placed team of Group A, Peru.
The runners-up of Group C, Chile, advanced to play the winners of Group B, Colombia.

Matches

Uruguay vs Ecuador

Japan vs Chile

Uruguay vs Japan

Ecuador vs Chile

Chile vs Uruguay

Ecuador vs Japan

Discipline
Fair play points would have been used as tiebreakers if the overall and head-to-head records of teams were tied. These were calculated based on yellow and red cards received in all group matches as follows:
first yellow card: minus 1 point;
indirect red card (second yellow card): minus 3 points;
direct red card: minus 4 points;
yellow card and direct red card: minus 5 points;

Only one of the above deductions were applied to a player in a single match.

References

External links
 
 Copa América Brasil 2019, CONMEBOL.com

Group C
Uruguay at the 2019 Copa América
Chile at the 2019 Copa América
Ecuador at the 2019 Copa América